Kenneth C. Flint (born June 23, 1947) is an American fantasy novelist. He has also written under the pseudonym Casey Flynn. A resident of Omaha, Nebraska, Flint taught literature and writing at the University of Nebraska at Omaha for six years before becoming English department head for Plattsmouth High School. In 1986 he quit teaching to become a full-time novelist. A majority of his works are either based on Irish myths and legends, or else are original stories involving concepts, and sometimes characters, from Irish mythology. His earliest and best known works center around three of the most important characters of Irish legend: Lugh, Cúchulainn, and Finn MacCumhal. More recently he has written a pair of Star Wars short stories, and a historical fiction novel, On Earth's Remotest Bounds: Year One: Blood and Water, the first of a planned series.

Bibliography

Finn MacCumhal series
 Challenge of the Clans (1986) Bantam Doubleday, 
 Storm Shield (1986) Bantam Doubleday, 
 The Dark Druid (1987) Bantam Books,

Gods of Ireland series
Writing as Casey Flynn.
 Most Ancient Song (1991)
 The Enchanted Isles (1991)

Sidhe series
 The Riders of the Sidhe (1984) Bantam, 
 Champions of the Sidhe (1985) Bantam Books, 
 Master of the Sidhe (1985) Spectra Books,

Novels
 A Storm Upon Ulster (1981) Bantam Books, a.k.a. The Hound of Culain
 Isle of Destiny (1988) Bantam Books, 
 Cromm (1989) Doubleday, 
 Otherworld (1991) Bantam Doubleday, 
 Legends Reborn (1992) Bantam USA, 
 The Darkening Flood (1994) Bantam USA, 
 On Earth's Remotest Bounds: Year One: Blood and Water (2004) iUniverse.com, 
 Star Wars: The Heart of the Jedi (2015) ordered by Lucasfilm, cancelled and years later rewritten and released online as fanfiction

Short stories
 "Doctor Death: The Tale of Dr. Evanzan and Ponda Baba" in Star Wars: Tales from the Mos Eisley Cantina (1995)
 "Old Friends: Ephant Mon's Tale" in Star Wars: Tales from Jabba's Palace (1996)

External links
 
 Entry at Nebraska Center for Writers
 Illustrated Bibliography for the works of Kenneth C. Flint

20th-century American novelists
21st-century American novelists
American fantasy writers
American male novelists
Writers from Omaha, Nebraska
1947 births
Living people
American male short story writers
20th-century American short story writers
21st-century American short story writers
20th-century American male writers
21st-century American male writers